World Gone Crazy may refer to:

 World Gone Crazy (The Screaming Jets album)
 World Gone Crazy (The Doobie Brothers album)